Reinhardt Ludwig (born 27 August 2002) is a South African rugby union player for the  in the Currie Cup. His regular position is lock.

Ludwig was named in the  squad for the 2021 Currie Cup Premier Division.

References

South African rugby union players
Living people
2002 births
Rugby union locks
Blue Bulls players
Bulls (rugby union) players
Rugby union players from Pretoria